The Valley Ice Garden was a 3,500-seat multi-purpose arena in Bozeman, Montana. It was built in 1996. It was home to the Big Sky Thunder of the National Indoor Football League team in 2006.

The arena was sold in May 2006 to Cardinal Distributing of Bozeman, Montana. It closed at the end of August 2006 to be renovated into a cold storage warehouse.

The Ice Garden was home to the NAHL's Bozeman Icedogs, the Bozeman Figure Skating Club, and the Gallatin Valley Hockey Club (But in 2005 BAHA and GVHC formed clubs and are now called the "Jr. Icedogs"). The facility was also hosts to numerous camps, clinics, tournaments, concerts, trade shows, and other community events throughout the course of the year.

External links
Bozeman Icedogs
Gallatin Valley Hockey Club
Bozeman Amateur Hockey Association

Indoor ice hockey venues in Montana
Buildings and structures in Bozeman, Montana
Defunct sports venues in Montana
Sports in Bozeman, Montana
Indoor arenas in Montana
1996 establishments in Montana
Sports venues completed in 1996